Gulf Shores International Airport/Jack Edwards Field  is a public use airport in Baldwin County, Alabama, United States. It is owned by Gulf Shores Airport Authority and located two nautical miles (4 km) north of the City of Gulf Shores. Also was known as Jack Edwards National Airport, it is included in the National Plan of Integrated Airport Systems for 2011–2015, which categorized it as a general aviation facility.

This airport is assigned a three-letter location identifier of JKA by the Federal Aviation Administration, but the International Air Transport Association (IATA) airport code is GUF. The International Civil Aviation Organization (ICAO) airport code is KJKA.

History 
Jack Edwards Airport was originally an outlying field (Canal Field) for Naval Air Station Pensacola. The U.S. Navy sold it to the state of Alabama in 1977 and the new airport was named for U.S. Rep. Jack Edwards. In 1983 the state sold the airport to the city of Gulf Shores. A new terminal was built in 1998 and a runway extension was completed in 2003.

Facilities and aircraft 
Jack Edwards Airport covers an area of 838 acres (339 ha) at an elevation of 17 feet (5 m) above mean sea level. It has two runways with asphalt surfaces: 9/27 is 6,962 by 100 feet (2,122 x 30 m) and 17/35 is 3,596 by 75 feet (1,096 x 23 m).

For the 12-month period ending February 20, 2009, the airport had 83,501 aircraft operations, an average of 228 per day: 97% general aviation and 3% military.
At that time there were 69 aircraft based at this airport: 75% single-engine, 19% multi-engine, 3% jet, and 3% helicopter.

Southern Airways Express previously served the airport, beginning in June 2013, but later ceased operations to a number of airports including Jack Edwards due to cost considerations.

References

External links 
 
 Aerial image as of February 1997 from USGS The National Map
 

Airports in Baldwin County, Alabama